Canard-Duchêne is a Champagne house founded in 1868 and currently part of the Thiénot group, owner of its own label Champagne Thiénot, plus Joseph Perrier and Marie Stuart.

The House was founded by Victor Canard and Léonie Duchêne, who gave their names to the champagne house.

History

In 1860, a barrel-maker called Victor Canard met a winemaker called Léonie Duchêne.  They fell madly in love and got married.  They both shared a great passion for wine and so they worked collaboratively to produce their own unique Champagne.  Using Victor's skills in farming grapes and ageing wines in barrels and Léonie's expertise in wine-tasting and viniculture, they produced a  Champagne only 8 years after they met.  Leonie was able to work in the wine industry during a time when the role of women was largely consigned to household duties.  Both Victor and Léonie put their surnames together to create Canard-Duchêne.  It is still one of the few wineries in Champagne to be family-run.

During the tumultuous aftermath of the French Revolution, Canard-Duchêne still managed to appeal to the citizens of France who abhorred any symbols of aristocracy.  This was probably because Canard-Duchêne never had large profit margins, unlike other houses such as Laurent-Perrier, and Moët & Chandon.  It was also due to the lucky fact that Napoleon loved drinking Champagne. Indeed, it was just after the French Revolution that the art of sabrage (opening a Champagne bottle with a sword) was invented and developed.  Canard-Duchêne has always been well-associated with this noble yet fun art form and holds tournaments where sommeliers compete in the art of sabrage.

In 1890, Victor and Léonie's son Edmond brought international fame to the Champagne House.  He even penetrated the very close circle of the suppliers to the Court of Tsar Nicholas II of Russia.  After Edmond secured a contract to be the official supplier of Champagne to the Romanov king, Canard-Duchêne adopted the Russian Imperial coat of arms as part of its logo, the two-headed eagle.  The symbol of the two-headed eagle is itself steeped in history: it is one of the oldest symbols of the duality of power of the emperor over both the state and the church, dating right back to the Byzantine period.

In 1978, Canard-Duchêne was associated with Veuve Clicquot and then joined the LVMH Group, which transmitted its rigour and search for quality.  Subsequently, the House saw substantial growth on European markets.   The takeover by the independent Champagne group Thiénot occurred in October 2003.

Champagnes
Canard-Duchêne produces a diverse range of champagnes.

Canard-Duchêne Brut Non-Vintage Champagne

The Authentic Brut Non-Vintage epitomises the Canard-Duchêne style, where freshness and intensity unite nobility and nature.  It is made from a blend of 60 different Cru wines, and the blend of grapes is made up of 45% Pinot Noir, 35% Pinot Meunier and 20% Chardonnay. Reserve wines from several years
make up at least 20% of the blend in order to give a consistent style year after year.

Canard-Duchêne Authentic Brut is characterised by its straw-yellow appearance and delicate mousse. Intense aromas of fresh fruit can be detected on the nose, typical of the Pinot grape varietals. On the palate, fruit aromas intermingle with pastry notes, a sign of excellent maturity.

The Canard-Duchêne Authentic Brut can be enjoyed with light foods, and particularly as an aperitif.

Canard-Duchêne Brut Non-Vintage Rosé Champagne

Delicate and feminine, the Canard-Duchêne Authentic Rosé reveals its distinctly elegant style.  Canard-Duchêne Authentic Rosé is a blend of 50% Pinot noir, 20% Pinot Meunier and 30% Chardonnay. The reserve wines, particularly red wines crafted from Pinot Noir from the Montagne de Reims, make up at least 10% of
the blend in order to give a consistent style year after year.

With its delicate, pinkish hue and magnificent, pearlised ribbon, the Canard-Duchêne Authentic Rosé stands out for its intense, fresh fruit aromas of strawberries and raspberries against a backdrop of mineral notes for enhanced freshness.  This rosé is delightful as an aperitif, can be enjoyed at parties or to accompany delicately-sweet desserts.

Grande Cuvée Charles VII NV Champagne

Charles VII was launched in 1968 to celebrate the 100th anniversary of Canard-Duchêne. The original name refers to the king who was led by Joan of Arc to be crowned in the Reims Cathedral in 1429.  The Charles VII champagnes offer great finesse and a subtle elegance, the expression of the know-how of Canard-Duchêne.  From the very beginning, the concept of the Grande Cuvée Charles VII has remained unchanged: a selection from among Champagne's most prestigious crus, a blend of several exceptional vintages that perpetuates the House's distinctive style: Fruity, elegant and versatile.

Environment

Unlike most major Champagne houses which are situated near the town, Canard-Duchêne is firmly established in the countryside of Ludes.  They aim for harmony between the buildings, the gardens and the Montagne de Reims National Park.  For the last 20 years Canard-Duchêne has made a commitment to sustainable agriculture and environmentally friendly production techniques.  The House recently launched an 'Authentic Green' initiative wherein they produced a Champagne made solely from organically-grown grapes.    According to the Canard-Duchêne website, "No words can express Canard-Duchêne's commitment to authentic organic principles better than its own hallmark 'Naturellement Noble'.  'Naturellement' contains the word 'Nature' which suggests love, respect and protection of Nature.  'Noble' conveys a feeling of greatness, generosity and responsibility".

Awards

Canard-Duchêne wines consistently obtain awards across the board for the Champagnes they produce.  Below is a summary of the awards some of their Champagnes won in 2012:

Canard-Duchêne Brut Non-Vintage Champagne
 'Bronze' in the Decanter World Wine Awards
 'Silver' in the International Wine & Spirit Competition
 'Bronze' in the International Wine Challenge
 Given 14/20 by Jancis Robinson, wine expert.

Canard-Duchêne Authentic Green Brut Non-Vintage
 'Commended' at the Decanter World Wine Awards
 'Silver' in the International Wine & Spirit Competition
 'Silver' in the International Wine Challenge

Canard-Duchêne Brut Non-Vintage Rosé Champagne
 'Bronze' in the Japan Wine Challenge
 'Commended' by the International Wine Challenge
 'Bronze' in the International Wine and Spirit Competition

Grande Cuvée Charles VII NV Champagne
 'Silver' in the Decanter World Wine Awards
 'Bronze' in the International Wine Challenge
 'Seal of Approval' at the Japan Wine Challenge
 Given 17/20 by Jancis Robinson

See also
 List of Champagne houses

References

Champagne producers